Stanley Plumly (May 23, 1939 – April 11, 2019) was an American poet and the director of University of Maryland, College Park's creative writing program.

Plumly grew up in Ohio and Virginia and was educated at Wilmington College in Ohio and at Ohio University. He taught for a number of years at Ohio University, where he helped found the Ohio Review. He taught the writing program at the University of Maryland.

Plumly died of multiple myeloma on April 11, 2019, in Frederick, Maryland, at the age of 79.

Bibliography

Poetry

Collections

How the Plains Indians Got Horses (Best Cellar Press, 1973)
Giraffe (Louisiana Press, 1974)
Out-of-the-Body Travel (Ecco/Viking, 1977)
Summer Celestial (Ecco/Norton, 1983)

Old Heart (W. W. Norton, 2007)
Orphan Hours (W. W. Norton, 2012)
Against Sunset (W. W. Norton, 2016)
Middle Distance (W.W. Norton, 2020)

List of poems

As editor

Nonfiction
 
Posthumous Keats: A Personal Biography (W. W. Norton, 2008)
The Immortal Evening: A Legendary Dinner With Keats, Wordsworth, and Lamb (W. W. Norton, 2014)
Elegy Landscapes: Constable and Turner and the Intimate Sublime (W. W. Norton, 2018)

Honors

Poet Laureate for the State of Maryland
Truman Capote Award for Literary Criticism, 2015
John William Corrington Award for Lifetime Achievement in Literature, 2010
Beall Award in Biography from PEN, 2009
Paterson Poetry Prize, 2008
LA Times Book Prize, 2008
Delmore Schwartz Memorial Award, 1972
Ingram Merrill Foundation Award
Pushcart Prize on six occasions
Academy Award in Literature from the American Academy of Arts and Letters
John William Corrington Award for Literary Excellence

Fellowships
 Rockefeller Foundation Fellowship
 Ingram-Merrill Fellowship
 1973 John Simon Guggenheim Fellowship
 National Endowment for the Arts Fellowship on three occasions
 1991 poet in residence at The Frost Place

References

External links
Faculty biography maintained by the University of Maryland
Stanley Plumly's Profile and a few poems at Academy of American Poets, Poetry.org website
"A Conversation with Stanley Plumly", Lisa Meyer, Boston Review 
"Stanley Plumly: An interview", The American Poetry Review, May 1995, David Biespiel, Rose Solari 
"Bright Stars: Campion’s Film of and from Keats", Poems Out Loud, Stanley Plumly, 10.22.09 
 Sherry Horowitz "Review of Stanley Plumly's book Old Heart: 'The Crystal Eye: The 'I' as a Prism' 2007

1939 births
2019 deaths
American academics of English literature
American male poets
Ohio University alumni
Poets Laureate of Maryland
The New Yorker people
University of Maryland, College Park faculty
Wilmington College (Ohio) alumni
People from Barnesville, Ohio
20th-century American poets
20th-century American male writers
21st-century American poets
21st-century American male writers
Poets from Ohio
20th-century American non-fiction writers
21st-century American non-fiction writers
American male non-fiction writers
Deaths from multiple myeloma